Island Of Jewels is a 1986 album by The Legendary Pink Dots.

Track listing

Personnel
Edward Ka'Spel – voice, occ. keyboards, electronix
The Silver Man (Phil Knight) – silverscapes, samplescopes, keyboards
Stret Majest (Barry Gray) – guitars
Patrick Q (Patrick Wright) – violins, keyboards, rhythm programmes, mandoline
(Graham Whitehead) – keyboards, piano, backing vocals
Hanz Myre – saxophone

Additional personnel
Hanz Myre – engineer

Notes
The first 5,000 copies of the PIAS and Penguin LP editions come housed in a gatefold sleeve with printed lyrics.
All editions contain different cover artwork.

References

 

1986 albums
The Legendary Pink Dots albums